Hinduism Invades America is an early twentieth-century scholarly work on the introduction of Hinduism in America, which was authored  by Wendell Thomas in 1930.

See also 
 Autobiography of a Yogi

References 

Hinduism studies books